During the 1975–76 season, Heart of Midlothian F.C. competed in the Scottish Premier Division, the Scottish Cup, the Scottish League Cup, the Anglo-Scottish Cup and the East of Scotland Shield.

Fixtures

Friendlies

East of Scotland Shield

Anglo-Scottish Cup

League Cup

Scottish Cup

Scottish Premier Division

Scottish Premier Division table

Squad information

See also
List of Heart of Midlothian F.C. seasons

References

Statistical Record 75-76

External links
Official Club website

Heart of Midlothian F.C. seasons
Heart of Midlothian